Barry William Perry (2 April 1939 – 2 June 2013) was an Australian rules footballer who played for the Collingwood Football Club in the Victorian Football League (VFL).

Notes

External links 

1939 births
Australian rules footballers from Victoria (Australia)
Collingwood Football Club players
2013 deaths